Yash Raj Films (abbreviated as YRF) is an Indian entertainment company, established by filmmaker Yash Chopra in 1970, that produces and distributes motion pictures. As of 2022, the company has produced over 80 Hindi films and one Tamil film. YRF started a film distribution business in 1997; in addition to distributing their own productions, the company has handled the domestic and/or international distribution of over 50 films from other companies. The most frequent collaborations of the company have been with the actors Rani Mukerji, Rishi Kapoor, Shah Rukh Khan, Anushka Sharma, Katrina Kaif, and Saif Ali Khan.

YRF's first release came in 1973 with the Chopra-directed Daag, a drama about bigamy, starring Rajesh Khanna, Raakhee and Sharmila Tagore. The company had four more releases in the 1970s, including the ensemble romantic drama Kabhi Kabhie and the action film Kaala Patthar, both of which starred Amitabh Bachchan and Raakhee. YRF's sole commercial success in the 1980s was the Sridevi-starring romantic musical Chandni. The year 1995 marked the directorial debut of Chopra's elder son Aditya Chopra with the highly successful romantic drama Dilwale Dulhania Le Jayenge. Starring Shahrukh Khan and Kajol, the film has the longest theatrical run in Indian cinema history. Other successful releases of the 1990s were Darr (1993) and Dil To Pagal Hai (1997), both starring Khan.

Since the 2000s, YRF produced a larger number of films. In addition to directorial ventures from Yash and Aditya, the company launched several new directors, including Sanjay Gadhvi, Vijay Krishna Acharya, Kunal Kohli, Siddharth Anand, Shaad Ali, and Ali Abbas Zafar. Some of the company's top-grossing films in the 2000s include Gadhvi's action thrillers Dhoom (2004) and Dhoom 2 (2006), Kohli's romantic thriller Fanaa (2006), Ali's crime comedy Bunty Aur Babli (2005), Yash's period romantic drama Veer-Zaara (2004), and Aditya Chopra's dramas Mohabbatein (2000) and Rab Ne Bana Di Jodi (2008). Beginning in 2008, the company introduced a number of new actors such as Anushka Sharma, Ranveer Singh, Parineeti Chopra, Arjun Kapoor, Bhumi Pednekar, and Vaani Kapoor.

YRF's highest-grossing films came in the 2010s with the YRF Spy Universe action thrillers Ek Tha Tiger (2012), Tiger Zinda Hai (2017) and War (2019), the action sequel Dhoom 3 (2013), and the sports drama Sultan (2016). All five films rank among the highest-grossing Hindi films of all time.

Films produced

Films distributed
The following films from other banners were distributed, in domestic and/or overseas markets, by the company:

Footnotes

References

External links
 
 Yash Raj Films at Bollywood Hungama

Yash Raj Films
Yash Raj Films films
Lists of Bollywood films
Lists of films by studio
Indian films by studio